The hypoglossal canal is a foramen in the occipital bone of the skull. It is hidden medially and superiorly to each occipital condyle. It transmits the hypoglossal nerve.

Structure 
The hypoglossal canal lies in the epiphyseal junction between the basiocciput and the jugular process of the occipital bone.

Variation 
Embryonic variants sometimes lead to the presence of more than two canals as the occipital bone is formed.

Development 
The hypoglossal canal is formed during the embryological stage of development in mammals.

Function 
The hypoglossal canal transmits the hypoglossal nerve from its point of entry near the medulla oblongata to its exit from the base of the skull near the jugular foramen.

Clinical significance 

Study of the hypoglossal canal aids in the diagnosis of a variety of tumors found at the base of the skull, including: large glomus jugulare neoplasms, myelomas, and the occasional meningioma. Studies of the hypoglossal canal revolve around the development of safe drilling techniques to conduct surgery on that area of the brain.

Research 
The hypoglossal canal has recently been used to try to determine the antiquity of human speech. Researchers have found that hominids who lived as long as 2 million years ago had the same size canal as that of modern-day chimpanzees; some scientists thus assume they were incapable of speech. However, archaic H. sapiens 400,000 years ago had the same size canal as that of modern humans, meaning they could have been capable of speech. Some Neanderthals also had the same size hypoglossal canal as archaic H. sapiens. However recent studies involving several primate species have failed to find conclusive evidence of a relationship between its size and speech.

Additional images

See also

References

External links 
 
 
 
 
 Image at uwo.ca

Foramina of the skull